The 2004 United States presidential election in South Carolina took place on November 2, 2004, as part of the 2004 United States presidential election which took place throughout all 50 states and D.C. Voters chose eight representatives, or electors to the Electoral College, who voted for president and vice president.

South Carolina was won by incumbent President George W. Bush by a 17.08% margin of victory. Prior to the election, all 12 news organizations considered this a state Bush would win, or otherwise a red state. No Democrat had won this state since 1976. On election day, Bush won a majority of the counties and congressional districts in the state. The results were very similar to the state's results in 2000, and very similar to the results in neighboring Georgia this election, although Democratic Senator John Edwards of the bordering state of North Carolina was chosen as the vice presidential nominee. Bush won Greenville County, the largest county in the state, by a margin of 33.23%.

Primaries 
For both parties in 2004, South Carolina's was the first primary in a Southern state and the first primary in a state in which African Americans make up a sizable percentage of the electorate.

The Democratic primary was held on February 3, with 45 delegates at stake. It was held on the same day as six other primaries and caucuses.

South Carolina's 45 delegates to the 2004 Democratic National Convention were awarded proportionally based on the results of the primary. The state also sent ten superdelegates.

Candidates
General Wesley Clark of Arkansas
Former Governor Howard Dean of Vermont
Senator John Edwards of North Carolina
Senator John Kerry of Massachusetts
Representative Dennis Kucinich of Ohio
Senator Joe Lieberman of Connecticut, 2000 Democratic Party vice-presidential candidate
Reverend Al Sharpton of New York

Withdrawn
Representative Dick Gephardt of Missouri, former House Minority Leader
Former Senator and Ambassador Carol Moseley-Braun of Illinois

Results

Campaign

Predictions

There were 12 news organizations who made state-by-state predictions of the election. Here are their last predictions before election day.

 D.C. Political Report: Solid Republican
 Associated Press: Solid Bush
 CNN: Bush
Cook Political Report: Solid Republican
 Newsweek: Solid Bush
New York Times: Solid Bush
 Rasmussen Reports: Bush
 Research 2000: Solid Bush
Washington Post: Bush
Washington Times: Solid Bush
Zogby International: Bush
 Washington Dispatch: Bush

Polling
Bush won every pre-election poll, each with a double-digit margin (except for one) and with at least 49% of the vote. The final 3 poll average showed Bush leading 55% to 41%.

Fundraising
Bush raised $3,113,641. Kerry raised $533,966.

Advertising and visits
Neither campaign advertised or visited this state during the fall election.

Analysis
South Carolina, historically part of the Solid South, has become a Republican stronghold in the past few presidential elections.  Since Barry Goldwater carried the state in 1964, the only Democratic presidential nominee to win it was Jimmy Carter of neighboring Georgia in 1976. Since then, the Palmetto State has been a safe bet for the Republicans. , this is the last election in which Charleston County voted for the Republican candidate.

Results

By county

Counties that flipped from Democratic to Republican
Chester (Largest city: Chester)

Counties that flipped from Republican to Democratic
Sumter (Largest city: Sumter)

By congressional district
Bush won 5 of 6 congressional districts including one district won by a Democrat.

Electors

Technically the voters of South Carolina cast their ballots for electors: representatives to the Electoral College. South Carolina is allocated 8 electors because it has 6 congressional districts and 2 senators. All candidates who appear on the ballot or qualify to receive write-in votes must submit a list of 8 electors, who pledge to vote for their candidate and his or her running mate. Whoever wins the majority of votes in the state is awarded all 8 electoral votes. Their chosen electors then vote for president and vice president. Although electors are pledged to their candidate and running mate, they are not obligated to vote for them. An elector who votes for someone other than his or her candidate is known as a faithless elector.

The electors of each state and the District of Columbia met on December 13, 2004, to cast their votes for president and vice president. The Electoral College itself never meets as one body. Instead the electors from each state and the District of Columbia met in their respective capitols.

The following were the members of the Electoral College from the state. All 8 were pledged for Bush/Cheney.
 Katon Dawson
 Buddy Witherspoon
 Wayland Moody
 Thomas McLean
 Brenda Bedenbaugh
 Edwin Foulke
 Robert Reagan
 Drew McKissick

References 

South Carolina
2004
Presidential